Italy–Philippines relations refer to the interstate and bilateral relations between Italy and the Philippines. The bilateral relations between Italy and the Philippines was established on 9 July 1947.

Bilateral relations
Italians have been in the Philippines even before the formation of the modern country. In the 1300s, the Italian Fransciscan Friar Odoric of Pordenone was said to have visited the then Kingdom of Caboloan (Pangasinan or Feng-chia-hsi-lan "馮嘉施蘭" in Chinese). The Italian chronicler Antonio Pigafetta visited the Philippines during the Magellan Expedition. Likewise when Spain had territory in Italy, Italian-Spaniards migrated to the Philippines during the Spanish colonial era. During the establishment of the First Philippine Republic, Italians joined the Philippine revolutionary army, one such Italian was Captain Camillo Ricchairdi, who worked under President Emilio Aguinaldo. Later on, the People Power Revolution in 1986 marked the beginning of expansion of bilateral relations between the two countries. Italy was the first country to recognize the Presidency of Corazon Aquino in the Philippines. Italy and the Philippines have signed several agreements, including in scientific and technical cooperation, air services, taxation, investments, development cooperation, culture, social security, small and medium enterprises, transportation and communications, and defense. The Philippines has welcomed a huge Italian business mission. The Confederation of Italian Industries, Italy's biggest association of manufacturing and services companies. The delegation also had parallel sectoral programs on trading, infrastructure and energy. Business-to-business meetings were also arranged between Italian and Philippine companies. In December 2015, a bilateral air transport agreement was signed between the two countries during the visit of Philippine President Benigno Aquino III to Rome to allow for the expansion of trade and tourism ties.

Filipinos in Italy

Filipinos form the fourth-largest migrant community in Italy, after the Romanian, Albanian, and North African communities. Italy is also the joint largest European migration destination for Filipinos. The Italian capital Rome is home to the largest Filipino community. Roughly 108,000 Filipinos reside in Italy legally as temporary workers or permanent residents, and estimates on the number of illegal Filipinos vary widely from 20,000 to 80,000. In 2008, ISTAT (Istituto Nazionale di Statistica), Italy's statistics office, reported that there were 113,686 documented Filipinos living in Italy whereas the number had been 105,675 in 2007. 63% of Filipino Italians are women and they mostly work as domestic assistants. The Filipino Department of Labor and Employment (DOLE) says that Italy allows 5000 non-seasonal/regular workers, up from 3000 in 2007. The DOLE said that the change was "a sign of appreciation of the good bilateral cooperation with the Philippines in migratory issues." There are approximately 60 Filipino organisations in Italy, most of which are church-based, although there are several cultural and civic groups as well. One of such groups is the Filipino Women's Council with the aim of educating Filipino women migrants about their rights and lobbying on their behalf. In 2007, Italy gave Filipinos with a Filipino driver's license a free Italian driver's license.

Italians in Philippines
Since the Spanish colonization a number of Italians have migrated to Philippines, mostly for missionary work.  and there have also been a few Italian who have settled in the Philippines. According to the 2010 census there were about 1,459 Italians living in the Philippines.

Giordano Ansaloni
Ansalone was born at Santo Stefano Quisquina in Sicily. Having entered the Dominican Order and completed his studies at Salamanca, he was sent in 1625, together with many others, as a missionary to the Philippine Islands. Whilst serving as chaplain in a hospital for Chinese and Japanese at Manila he learned their languages.

In 1631, he offered to go to Japan and arrived at the outbreak of the persecution in 1632. Disguised as a bonze, he travelled over the land and administered the rites of the Catholic religion.

He was arrested 4 August 1634, and subjected to tortures that lasted seven days. He was forced to witness the beheading of his companion, Thomas of St. Hyacinth, and sixty-nine other Christians. On 18 November he was executed at Nagasaki, Japan, by being suspended till dead from a plank with his head buried in the ground.

See also 
 Foreign relations of Italy 
 Foreign relations of the Philippines

References

 
Philippines
Bilateral relations of the Philippines